Mastodon Minutes was the weekly news program for Indiana University - Purdue University Fort Wayne and taped at the College Access Television Studios, Walter E. Helmke Library in Fort Wayne, Indiana.

Overview
Mastodon Minutes originally was developed as a program that "strived to get IPFW students more involved on campus." The program's tone was informative and humorous with original anchors Kourtney Bell and Ryan Lower. Starting in season three, the program began to emphasize more in-depth news coverage of events at IPFW with a lesser emphasis on humor.

See also
 The IPFW Communicator
 Indiana University - Purdue University Fort Wayne

References

English-language television shows